Washington Sewallis Shirley, 9th Earl Ferrers (3 January 1822 – 13 March 1859), styled Hon. Washington Shirley from 1827 to 1830 and Viscount Tamworth from 1830 to 1842, was a British nobleman.

The elder son of Robert William Shirley, Viscount Tamworth, he succeeded his father as heir apparent in 1830. Tamworth, as he then was, was educated at Eton College and succeeded his grandfather, Washington, in the earldom in 1842. On 23 July 1844, he married Augusta Annabella Chichester, daughter of Lord Edward Chichester (later Marquess of Donegall), at St George's, Hanover Square. They had five children:
a stillborn son (16 July 1845)
Sewallis Edward Shirley, 10th Earl Ferrers (1847–1912)
Lady Amelia Anne Shirley (1 December 1848 – 6 September 1849)
Lady Augusta Amelia Shirley (25 December 1849 – 10 February 1933), married Sir Archdale Palmer, 4th Baronet on 19 August 1873
Hon. Devereux Hugh Lupus Shirley (16 July 1853 – 22 February 1854)

On 10 February 1852, Ferrers was appointed a deputy lieutenant of Leicestershire, and on 10 January 1857, a deputy lieutenant of Staffordshire. He died at Staunton Harold in 1859 aged 37 and was buried there.

References

1822 births
1859 deaths
Deputy Lieutenants of Leicestershire
Deputy Lieutenants of Staffordshire
09
People educated at Eton College